Claudine Falonne Meffometou Tcheno (born 1 July 1990) is a Cameroonian footballer who plays as a defender for FC Fleury 91 of the Division 1 Féminine and for the Cameroon women's national football team. She has represented her country at the 2012 London Olympics and the 2015 FIFA Women's World Cup.

International goals

Honours 
Zvezda 2005 Perm
Winner
 Russian Women's Football Championship: 2014

ŽFK Spartak Subotica
Winner
 Serbian Super Liga (women): 2012–13, 2013–14

References

External links 
 
 
 

1990 births
Living people
Women's association football defenders
Cameroonian women's footballers
Cameroon women's international footballers
2015 FIFA Women's World Cup players
2019 FIFA Women's World Cup players
Olympic footballers of Cameroon
Footballers at the 2012 Summer Olympics
African Games silver medalists for Cameroon
African Games medalists in football
Competitors at the 2015 African Games
Russian Women's Football Championship players
Zvezda 2005 Perm players
ŽFK Spartak Subotica players
Division 1 Féminine players
Cameroonian expatriate women's footballers
Cameroonian expatriate sportspeople in Russia
Expatriate women's footballers in Russia
Cameroonian expatriate sportspeople in Serbia
Expatriate women's footballers in Serbia
FC Fleury 91 (women) players
20th-century Cameroonian women
21st-century Cameroonian women